Ali Artuner (5 September 1944 – 16 February 2001) was a Turkish footballer who played as a goalkeeper for Göztepe and the Turkish national team in the 1960s, rising to the position of captain on both teams. In his hometown of İzmir, there are many sports complexes and tournaments bearing his name.

He is also the uncle of former Turkish international goalkeeper, Cenk Gönen.

Playing career

Club career
Born in İzmir, Artuner started out as a halfback. However, he left school at the age of 17, and made his professional debut for Göztepe  as goalkeeper that same year (1961). He went on to play 15 consecutive seasons for his team in the Süper Lig. He also helped them win the 1968–69 and 1969–70 editions of the Turkish Cup, as well as the 1970 Turkish Super Cup. He is widely seen as a club legend, and was nicknamed "Moskova panteri" (Moscow Panther).

International career
Artuner made his debut for the senior national team on 21 July 1965, in a 3–1 win over Pakistan in the 1965 RCD Cup. He represented Turkey at the 1966 FIFA World Cup qualification, playing in one game. He then played in six games at the UEFA Euro 1968 qualifying, as well as two games at the 1970 FIFA World Cup qualification. The last major tournament he played in was the UEFA Euro 1972 qualifying, where he played in five games. He captained his team in four of those games (two against West Germany, and one each against Albania and Poland).

References

External links
 
 
 
 

1944 births
2001 deaths
Footballers from İzmir
Turkish footballers
Turkey international footballers
Turkey under-21 international footballers
Turkey youth international footballers
Association football goalkeepers
Göztepe S.K. footballers
Süper Lig players